List of Guggenheim Fellowships awarded in 1976

References

1976
1976 awards